Katie Rickett Shaw (born 19 August 1968) is British a former professional tennis player.

A right-handed player from Birmingham, Rickett reached a career high ranking of 291 in the world.

Rickett qualified as a lucky loser for the main draw of the 1988 Australian Open and was beaten in the first round by Marie-Christine Damas.

ITF finals

Singles: 1 (0–1)

Doubles: 5 (1–4)

References

External links
 
 

1968 births
Living people
British female tennis players
English female tennis players
Tennis people from the West Midlands (county)